Dean Morton (born February 27, 1968) is a Canadian former ice hockey referee in the National Hockey League (NHL), and a former defenceman who played one game in the NHL in 1989.

Biography 
As a youth, Morton played in the 1981 Quebec International Pee-Wee Hockey Tournament with a minor ice hockey team from Peterborough, Ontario.

He played in one NHL game for the Detroit Red Wings during the 1989–90 NHL season, and is one of only four players to score a goal in their only NHL game, along with Brad Fast, Samuel Henley, and Rolly Huard.

He received media attention on HBO's 24/7 Winter Classic special when a post-game dressing room scene showed him being congratulated for a "ballsy call" by partner Stephen Walkom. The call in question was a goaltender interference call to disallow a goal by the Pittsburgh Penguins that would have tied the game against the Washington Capitals.

Dean Morton officiated his final NHL game on March 12, 2022 in Calgary, Alberta at the Saddledome in a game between the Calgary Flames and the Detroit Red Wings.

Career statistics

Regular season and playoffs

See also
 List of NHL on-ice officials
 List of players who played only one game in the NHL

References

External links
 

1968 births
Living people
Adirondack Red Wings players
Brantford Smoke players
Canadian ice hockey defencemen
Cincinnati Cyclones (IHL) players
Detroit Red Wings draft picks
Detroit Red Wings players
Hampton Roads Admirals players
Ice hockey people from Ontario
Moncton Hawks players
National Hockey League officials
Oshawa Generals players
Ottawa 67's players
San Diego Gulls (IHL) players
Sportspeople from Peterborough, Ontario